Strabane Sigersons is a Gaelic Athletic Association club. The club is based in the town of Strabane, County Tyrone, Northern Ireland.

The club concentrates on Gaelic football activities accommodating for both males and females from the ages of 4 until adult level . Another club in the town is Shamrocks, which fields teams for the games of Hurling and Camogie.

The senior men's team will play in Intermediate Football in 2023 having won promotion in 2022 from Junior Football.

The senior Ladies team won the Junior 'B' League and Championship in 2023 and will play in Junior Football in 2022.

References

External links
 https://www.facebook.com/StrabaneSigersonsGAA
 https://twitter.com/SigersonsGAA

Gaelic games clubs in County Tyrone
Gaelic football clubs in County Tyrone
Strabane